Afsaneh Chatrenoor (born 14 April 1998) is an Iranian footballer who plays as a midfielder for Kowsar Women Football League club Shahrdari Sirjan. She has been a member of the senior Iran women's national team.

International goals

References 

1998 births
Living people
Iranian women's footballers
Iran women's international footballers
Women's association football midfielders
People from Zanjan, Iran
21st-century Iranian women